Anxi may refer to:

 Anxi County, Quanzhou, Fujian
 Guazhou County, formerly Anxi County, in Jiuquan, Gansu
 Guazhou Town, formerly Anxi Town, in what is now Guazhou County
 Protectorate General to Pacify the West, a Central-Asian military government established by Tang Dynasty
 Arsacid Empire, rendered as Anxi in historical Chinese writings
 Anxi., a song from Kelly Lee Owens' self-titled album.